Antoine Dupont (born 15 November 1996) is a French professional rugby union player. He currently plays at scrum half for Toulouse in the Top 14 and captains the France national team. In 2021, Dupont won World Rugby Men's 15s Player of the Year. He is considered, by many, to be the best player in the world.

Early life and education
Dupont was born in Lannemezan but grew up in the nearby village of Castelnau-Magnoac where he started rugby for Magnoac FC at the age of 4. In 2011, he joined Auch as a junior.  Dupont studied for a master's degree in sport management in 2019 at the Toulouse School of Management

Professional career
In 2014, Dupont joined Castres in the Top 14 after the relegation of Auch in the 2013–14 Rugby Pro D2 season. 

In November 2016, Stade Toulousain announced Antoine Dupont's recruitment for the 2017–18 season. 

In 2019, Dupont won the Top 14 with Toulouse after defeating Clermont Auvergne 24-18 in the 2018-19 final. 

In May 2021, Dupont won the European Rugby Champions Cup with Toulouse after defeating La Rochelle 22-17 in the 2020-2021 final. As captain, he lifted the trophy after the final whistle. In the same year, Toulouse completed the domestic and European double winning the Top 14 for the 2nd time beating La Rochelle 18-8 in the final. 

He was awarded the World Rugby Men's 15s Player of the Year in 2021.

International career
In 2016, he was selected for the France U-20 team for the 2016 World Rugby Under 20 Championship. He was one of the stars of the tournament scoring 36 points which included 5 tries.

In November 2016, he was selected for the French Barbarian team which played and beat Australia.

Dupont was called up to the French first team for the first time ahead of France's fourth 2017 Six Nations Championship match against Italy as a replacement for Maxime Machenaud. He made his debut in that game coming on for Baptiste Serin in the 72nd minute of an eventual 40–18 away win.

He is the third French captain after Fabien Pelous and Thierry Dusautoir to have beaten Australia, New Zealand and South Africa.

International tries

Honours

International 
 France
Six Nations Championship: 2022
Grand Slam: 2022

Club 
 Toulouse
Top 14: 2018–19, 2020–21
European Rugby Champions Cup: 2020–2021

Individual 
Six Nations Player of the Tournament: 2020, 2022
World Rugby Player of the Year: 2021

References

External links
 France profile at FFR
 Ligue Nationale De Rugby Profile
 European Professional Club Rugby Profile

Living people
1996 births
French rugby union players
Rugby union scrum-halves
Castres Olympique players
Stade Toulousain players
Sportspeople from Hautes-Pyrénées
France international rugby union players
World Rugby Players of the Year